Plattsburgh City Hall is an historic government building located at City Hall Place in Plattsburgh, Clinton County, New York. It was designed by architect John Russell Pope and constructed in 1917.  It is a three-story, steel frame, limestone clad building in the Classical Revival style. It features a projecting entrance portico with six Doric order columns and a low central dome.

It was added to the National Register of Historic Places on December 12, 1973.

See also
List of Registered Historic Places in Clinton County, New York

References

City and town halls on the National Register of Historic Places in New York (state)
John Russell Pope buildings
Neoclassical architecture in New York (state)
Government buildings completed in 1917
U.S. Route 9
Buildings and structures in Clinton County, New York
National Register of Historic Places in Clinton County, New York